Moroni Charles Woods (January 11, 1885 - May 7, 1938) was an American architect and Mormon leader. He designed many private residences, commercial and public buildings, schools and churches in Utah, including the NRHP-listed Heber Scowcroft House, and he was the president of the L.D.S. mission in New Zealand from 1935 to 1938.

Works include:
Thirteenth Ward (1919), aka Art Center & Academy, Inc., Ogden, Utah  
Scowcroft House (1909), 105 23rd Street, Ogden, Utah 
Weber State University Gymnasium, Weber State College Campus, Ogden, Utah

References

1938 deaths
People from Ogden, Utah
Architects from Utah
American expatriates in New Zealand
20th-century American architects
1885 births